Wiqu (Aymara for a corner in a house, a mountain cove, Hispanicized spelling Veco) is a mountain east of the Barroso mountain range in the Andes of Peru, about  high. It is located in the Tacna Region, Tacna Province, Palca District, and in the Tarata Province, Tarata District. Wiqu lies southwest of the mountain Warawarani.

References 

Mountains of Tacna Region
Mountains of Peru